The 1947 Muhlenberg Mules football team was an American football team represented Muhlenberg College during the 1947 college football season.  In its second season under head coach Ben Schwartzwalder, the team compiled a 9–1 record and outscored opponents by a total of 368 to 49. The team's only loss was to Temple by a 7–6 score. The team was invited to play in the 1948 Tangerine Bowl, but the school's athletic committee declined the invitation. The team played its home games at Muhlenberg Field in Allentown, Pennsylvania.

Schedule

References

Muhlenberg
Muhlenberg Mules football seasons
Muhlenberg Mules football